SM U-162 was one of the 329 submarines serving in the Imperial German Navy in World War I. 
U-162 was engaged in the naval warfare and took part in the First Battle of the Atlantic.

Design
German Type U 93 submarines were preceded by the shorter Type U 87 submarines. U-162 had a displacement of  when at the surface and  while submerged. The submarine was powered by two  engines for use while surfaced, and two  engines for use while submerged. She had two propeller shafts and two  propellers.

U-162 was fitted with six  torpedo tubes (four at the bow and two at the stern), twelve to sixteen torpedoes, and one  SK L/45 deck gun. She had a complement of thirty-six (thirty-two crew members and four officers).

References

Notes

Citations

Bibliography

World War I submarines of Germany
German Type U 93 submarines
Ships built in Bremen (state)
1918 ships
U-boats commissioned in 1918
Foreign submarines in French service